Astrostatistics is a discipline which spans astrophysics, statistical analysis and data mining. It is used to process the vast amount of data produced by automated scanning of the cosmos, to characterize complex datasets, and to link astronomical data to astrophysical theory.  Many branches of statistics are involved in astronomical analysis including nonparametrics, multivariate regression and multivariate classification, time series analysis, and especially Bayesian inference. The field is closely related to astroinformatics.

Professional association
Practitioners are represented by the International Astrostatistics Association affiliated with the International Statistical Institute, the International Astronomical Union Working Group in Astrostatistics and Astroinformatics, the American Astronomical Society Working Group in Astroinformatics and Astrostatistics, the American Statistical Association Interest Group in Astrostatistics, and the Cosmostatistics Initiative.  All of these organizations participate in the Astrostatistics and Astroinformatics Portal Web site.

References

Astrophysics
Applied statistics
Data mining
Machine learning